Kundeling Monastery is a Tibetan Buddhist monastery in Lhasa, Tibet, China. It was founded around 1794, and follows the Gelug school. The head of the monastery belongs to a lineage of incarnations that dates back to 1402. There is dispute over the current incarnation. The monastery was destroyed during the Cultural Revolution, then rebuilt in the 1980s.

History

Kunde Ling means "peaceful and happy" in the Tibetan language.
The original Kunde Ling Monastery was built in 1794, one of four royal temples in Lhasa. It is thought to have been the successor to the Yangs-pa-can, or  Yangs-can, monastery founded in 1490 and destroyed in 1792.
the Qing Emperor established the Kundeling Temple in lhasa near the Potala Palace and offered it to that Tatsak in celebration of the success of the Gurkha War. A Qing inscription translated by Hugh Richardson at the site of the monastery states that the Chinese military commander Fu Kang'an (d.1796) and the amban Helin, who served in Lhasa in 1793, founded the as a religious offering for the military victory. The inscription also gives possession of the temple to the Tatsak in perpetuity. It henceforth served as the seat of the Tatsak incarnation, and subsequent incarnations of the Tatsak Jedrung were also known as the Kundeling Hutuktu. 
The monastery was built outside the city walls of Lhasa on the road leading west.
It followed the Gelug school.

Kun-bde gling is known for owning the printing blocks for the religion-historical work called The Blue Annals (Deb-ther sngon-po), written in 1478. 
It also owned blocks for various other works.
By 1830 the monastery owned extensive estates acquired by imperial grants, donations or purchase from the local peasants. 
These provided income to support the monastery.

Kundeling  was destroyed in the early 1960s during the Cultural Revolution,
A much smaller Kundeling monastery was built slightly to the west of the former location in the 1980s.
Monasteries are important tourist attractions in Lhasa.
In 2011 the government had allocated about US $3 million for restoration of the building's fabric, including repairs to the roof, walls, courtyard and drains.
That year the monastery was listed as a key protected cultural site.

Today

The monastery is at the foot of the Bar-ma ri (Parma Ri) mountain, below the Ges-ar Temple, which it owned.
It is near Beijing Middle Road. Two restored chapels are open to visitors. 
On an upper level there is a mural of the original temple, which was mostly destroyed.
In 2011 it was reported that there were forty-two monks, of whom ten were teenagers or in their early twenties. This was down from eighty in the 1990s.
The young monks undertake most of the work of cleaning, cooking and minor repairs.
Their life is austere, with no modern conveniences.

Tatsag lineage

The proprietors of the monastery, who hold the title rTa-tshag rje-drung ho-thog-thu, or sometimes rTa-tshag rje-drung rin-po-che, are considered to be incarnations.
The first member of the Tatsag lineage was Baso Chokyi Gyaltsen (Wylie Ba-so Chos-kyi rgyal-mtshan; 1402–73).
The eighth incarnation, Yeshe Lobsang Tenpai Gonpo (1760–1810), was granted ownership of the monastery. 
Proprietors of the monastery since then have been:
8. rTa-tshag (III) Ba-so rje-drung qutuqtu Ye-shes blo-bzang bstan-pa'i mgon-po alias Yi-hsi luo-sang tan-pei kung-pu (1760–1810)
9. rTa-tshag (IV) Ngag-dbang blo-bzang bstan-pa'i rgyal-mtshan alias Luo-pu-sang tan-pei chien-ts'an (1811–48)
10. rTa-tshag (V) Ngag-dbang dpal-ldan chos-kyi rgyal-mtshan alias A-wang pan-tien ch'u-chi chien-ts'an (1850/1854–86)
11. rTa-tshag (VI) Ngag-dbang thub-ldan skal-bzang sgron-me (1888–1918)
12. rTa-tshag (VII) Blo-bzang thub-bstan 'jigs-med rgyal-mtshan (1924–56)
The eighth and tenth members of this lineage served as regents of Tibet (1789–90, 1791–1811, 1875–86).
The thirteenth member of the lineage as recognized by the Dalai Lama was rTa-tshag (VIII) bsTan-'dzin chos-kyi rgyal-mtshan, born about 1958.
He fled to India in 1959.
A parallel incarnation is recognized in Lhasa, rTa-tshag (VIII) Blo-bzang ye-shes.

References

Sources

 
 

Buildings and structures in Lhasa
Buddhist monasteries in Lhasa
Gelug monasteries and temples
1663 establishments in Asia
Chengguan District, Lhasa